, officially , is a district of Chiyoda, Tokyo, Japan. As of April 1, 2007, its population is 75. Its postal code is 101-0043.

This district is located on the northeastern part of Chiyoda Ward. It borders Kanda-Higashimatsushitachō on the north and east, Kanda-Konyachō on the south, and Kajichō on the west.

Tomiyamachō is a commercial district near Kanda Station.

Education
 operates public elementary and junior high schools. Chiyoda Elementary School (千代田小学校) is the zoned elementary school for Kanda-Tomiyamachō. There is a freedom of choice system for junior high schools in Chiyoda Ward, and so there are no specific junior high school zones.

References

Districts of Chiyoda, Tokyo